Yahya, also spelled Yehya, is an Arabic male given name. 
According to the Qur'anic narrative, it is an Arabic form of the given name John, originally Hebrew Yohanan (Yəhôḥānān
יְהוֹחָנָן‎  "Yahu is gracious"), i.e. primarily John the Baptist, who is known as
Yahya ibn Zakariyya in Islam, and is considered a prophet in Islam. For this reason, Yahya is a comparatively common name in the Muslim world. 
The related Biblical name of Jehiah (Yᵊḥîyâ יְחִיָּה "Yahu lives") has the Arabic form Yaḥiyyā ., having the same Arabic consonantal text as the name Yahya does.

In Persian, Yahya is a title of address for a senior village or community elder. It is also a common nickname for the 12th Imam.

Mononym
 Yahya ibn Sarafyun (9th century), Arabic medical writer known in medieval Europe as Johannes Serapion
 Yahya ibn Khalid (died 806), Vizier of the Persian Barmakids family
 Yahya ibn Umar ibn Yahya ibn Husayn ibn Zayd ibn Ali Zayn al-Abidin ibn Al-Husayn ibn Ali al-Murtada, Alid imam
 Yahya ibn al-Walid, was an Umayyad prince and son of Umayyad caliph Al-Walid I (r. 705–715).
 Yahya ibn Yazid, was an Umayyad prince and son of Umayyad caliph Yazid II (r. 720–724).
 Abu Yahya Ibn al-Batriq (fl. 796–806), translator of Greek scientific texts
 Yahya ibn Asad, Samanid ruler of Shash (819–855) and Samarkand (851/852–855)
 Yahya ibn Muhammad (aka Yahya I), Idrisid ruler (848–864)
 Yahya ibn Yahya (died 874), sixth Idrisid ruler and sultan of Morocco
 Yahya of Antioch (Yahya ibn Sa'ïd), 11th-century Syrian chronicler
 Yahya (Zaragoza) (fl. 1021–1029), full name Yahya ibn al-Mundhir, 11th century ruler of Zaragoza
 Yahya bin Ahmad Sirhindi, 15th century Persian language writer from the Delhi Sultanate of India
 Sultan Yahya (1585–1649), son of Sultan Mehmed III, a Christian convert and a claimant to the Ottoman throne
 Yahya bey Dukagjini (1498–1582), Ottoman diwan poet

Given name
 Yahya Abdul-Mateen II (born 1986), American actor
 Yahya Al-Shehri (born 1990), Saudi footballer
 Yahya Ayyash (1966–1996), member and chief bombmaker of Hamas
 Yahya Boushaki (1935–1960), Algerian politician and military
 Yahya El Hindi (born 1998), Lebanese footballer
 Yahya Goba, Yemeni-American terrorist suspect arrested and charged as part of the War on Terror together with the other members of the "Lackawanna Six"
 Yahya Golmohammadi (born 1971), Iranian footballer
 Yahya Muhammad Hamid ed-Din (1869–1948), imam of the Zaydis (1904) and king of Yemen (1926)
 Yahya Hassan (born 1995), Palestinian-Danish poet and politician
 Yahya Jammeh (born 1965), president of The Gambia
 Yahya Khan (1917–1980), former Chief Martial Law Administrator of Pakistan and Chief of Army Staff
 Yahya Rahim Safavi (born 1958), commander in chief of the Islamic Revolutionary Guards Corps (IRGC)
 Mirza Yahya Nuri Subh-i Azal (1831–1912), Persian religious leader of Azali Bábism
 Yahya Petra of Kelantan (1917–1979), sixth Yang di-Pertuan Agong (roughly equivalent to King) of Malaysia
Yahya ibn Muhammad (829-864), fifth Idrisid ruler of Morocco
Yahya ibn Yahya, sixth Idrisid ruler Morocco
Yahya ibn al-Qasim, eighth Idrisid ruler of Morocco
Yahya ibn Idris ibn Umar, ninth Idrisid ruler of Morocco
Yahya ibn Ibrahim, one of the founder of the Almoravid dynasty
Yahya ibn Umar al-Lamtuni, chieftain of Lamtuna and the first emir of the Almoravid
Abu Zakariya Yahya, founder and the first sultan of the Hafsid dynasty in Ifriqiya
Yahya Rahmani Indian social

Surname
 Adel Yahya (born 1982), English Islamist
 Ahmad bin Yahya (1891–1962), Yemeni imam
 Ali Yahya (1947–2014), Israeli Arab diplomat
 Yaish Ibn Yahya (ca1115-ca1151 or 1196), Scholar, politician, military leader.
 Izz al-Din Yahya, 14th-century ruler of Satgaon, Bengal
 Mohammed Yahya (1901–1990), Pakistani politician
 Tahir Yahya (1916–1986), Iraqi politician
Yahya Rahmani indian social Activist 
Abu Yahya ibn Abd al-Haqq, Marinid emir at Fez
Yaghmurasen ibn Zyan, also called Abu Yahya I, the first sultan of the Zayyanid dynasty at Tlemcen
Abu Hafs Umar bin Yahya, Hafsid caliph of Ifriqiya
Abu Yahya Abu Bakr as-Shahid, Hafsid caliph of Ifriqiya and a martyr
Shiekh Muhammad Yahya Waseem, Son of Waseem Akbar

See also
Yahyaabad (disambiguation)

References 

Arabic-language surnames
Arabic masculine given names
Turkish masculine given names